Włodzimierz Heliński (16 July 1955 – 1 May 2021) was a Polish speedway rider.

Biography
He obtained his speedway license in 1974. In the competition of the Polish team championship (DMP), he represented the clubs of "Unia" Leszno (1979–1985) and "Start" Gniezno. He won seven DMP medals: three gold (1979, 1980, 1984), two silver (1982, 1983) and two bronze (1981, 1985). In 1980 he won the Polish team Cup, and in 1984 in Toruń - the title of the Polish champion of club pairs.

Heliński was promoted to the finals of the individual Polish championships three times, in 1983 (Gdańsk - 8th place), 1984 (Gorzów Wielkopolski - 11th place) and 1990 (Lublin - 12th place). He twice stood on the podium of the Alfred Smoczyk memorials held in Leszno (1980 - 2nd place, 1982 - 3rd place).

References

1955 births
2021 deaths
Polish speedway riders
People from Leszno